André Santos (born January 8, 1981) is a Brazilian mixed martial artist currently competing in the Welterweight division of Absolute Championship Berkut. A professional competitor since 2006, he has also competed for Bellator.

Mixed martial arts career

Early career
Santos made his professional MMA debut in December 2006 and, prior to signing with Bellator, he amassed a 36–9 record fighting outside of the United States, mainly in his native Brazil. During this time, Santos won the vacant MMA Champions League welterweight championship. He also unsuccessfully fought for the Bitetti Combat welterweight championship.

Santos was ranked as the ninth best welterweight prospect by MMA website Bloody Elbow in 2012.

Bellator MMA
Santos made his Bellator and United States debut on October 17, 2014 against Strikeforce veteran James Terry at Bellator 129. He won the fight via unanimous decision.

Replacing an injured Douglas Lima, Santos faced Paul Daley at Bellator 134 on February 27, 2015. He lost the fight via unanimous decision.

Santos faced UFC veteran, Josh Neer, at Bellator 146 on November 20, 2015. He won the fight via unanimous decision.

Championships and accomplishments

Mixed martial arts
MMA Champions League
MMACL welterweight championship (one time)

Mixed martial arts record

|-
|Loss
|align=center|38–11
|Brett Cooper
|KO (punches)
|ACB 82: Silva vs. Kolobegov
|
|align=center|1
|align=center|1:42
|São Paulo, Brazil
|
|-
|Win
|align=center|38–10
|Josh Neer
|Decision (unanimous)
|Bellator 146
|
|align=center|3
|align=center|5:00
|Thackerville, Oklahoma, United States
| 
|-
|Loss
|align=center|37–10
|Paul Daley
|Decision (unanimous)
|Bellator 134
|
|align=center|3
|align=center|5:00
|Uncasville, Connecticut, United States
| 
|-
|Win
|align=center|37–9
|James Terry
|Decision (unanimous)
|Bellator 129
|
|align=center|3
|align=center|5:00
|Council Bluffs, Iowa, United States
|
|-
|Win
|align=center|36–9
|Ramil Mustapayev
|KO (punches)
|Fight Nights: Battle of Moscow 13
|
|align=center|2
|align=center|0:41
|Moscow, Russia
|
|-
|Win
|align=center|35–9
|Beslan Isaev
|Submission (guillotine choke)
|Fight Nights: Battle on Terek
|
|align=center|2
|align=center|3:51
|Grozny, Russia
|
|-
|Win
|align=center|34–9
|Ney Duarte dos Santos
|Submission (anaconda choke)
|Gigante Fight: Mixed Martial Arts
|
|align=center|1
|align=center|2:11
|Cabo Frio, Rio de Janeiro, Brazil
|
|-
|Win
|align=center|33–9
|Cassiano Ricardo Castanho de Freitas
|TKO (punches)
|MMA Champions League
|
|align=center|1
|align=center|4:39
|Barra da Tijuca, Rio de Janeiro, Brazil
|
|-
|Win
|align=center|32–9
|Chad Reiner
|Submission (anaconda choke)
|Show Fighting Enterprise 1 
|
|align=center|1
|align=center|3:31
|Quito, Ecuador
|
|-
|Loss
|align=center|31–9
|Hernani Perpetuo
|Decision (unanimous)
|Web Fight Combat
|
|align=center|3
|align=center|5:00
|Rio de Janeiro, Brazil
|
|-
|Loss
|align=center|31–8
|Sérgio Souza
|TKO (punches)
|Team Nogueira: MMA Circuit 2
|
|align=center|3
|align=center|N/A
|Rio de Janeiro, Brazil
|
|-
|Win
|align=center|31–7
|Moises dos Santos
|Submission (D'arce choke)
|BOTB: Para vs. Brazil
|
|align=center|1
|align=center|1:20
|Belém, Pará, Brazil
|
|-
|Loss
|align=center|30–7
|Cassiano Ricardo Castanho de Freitas
|Submission (guillotine choke)
|Bitetti Combat 12: Oswaldo Paqueta
|
|align=center|1
|align=center|1:00
|Rocinha, Rio de Janeiro, Brazil
|
|-
|Win
|align=center|30–6
|Gil de Freitas
|Decision (unanimous)
|Mortal Kombat Championship 1
|
|align=center|3
|align=center|5:00
|Rio de Janeiro, Brazil
|
|-
|Win
|align=center|29–6
|Julian Fabrin Soares
|Submission (anaconda choke)
|Bitetti Combat 10
|
|align=center|2
|align=center|2:31
|Rio de Janeiro, Brazil
|
|-
|Win
|align=center|28–6
|Edilberto de Oliveira
|Decision (unanimous)
|Bitetti Combat 10
|
|align=center|2
|align=center|5:00
|Rio de Janeiro, Brazil
|
|-
|Win
|align=center|27–6
|Ivan Jorge
|Decision (unanimous)
|Bitetti Combat 10
|
|align=center|3
|align=center|5:00
|Rio de Janeiro, Brazil
|
|-
|Win
|align=center|26–6
|Tiago Monaco Tosato
|Submission (anaconda choke)
|High Fight Rock 1
|
|align=center|1
|align=center|1:40
|Goiânia, Goiás, Brazil
|
|-
|Loss
|align=center|25–6
|Jose de Ribamar Machado Gomes
|TKO (punches)
|WFE 9: Platinum
|
|align=center|2
|align=center|1:20
|Salvador, Bahia, Brazil
|
|-
|Loss
|align=center|25–5
|Mauro Chimento Jr.
|Submission (armbar)
|Watch Out Combat Show 11
|
|align=center|1
|align=center|1:29
|Campo Grande, Mato Grosso do Sul, Brazil
|
|-
|Win
|align=center|25–4
|Jucelino Ferreira
|TKO (punches)
|Face to Face 4
|
|align=center|2
|align=center|3:10
|Recreio dos Bandeirantes, Rio de Janeiro, Brazil
|
|-
|Win
|align=center|24–4
|Alberto dos Santos
|Submission (anaconda choke)
|X-Fight
|
|align=center|1
|align=center|3:36
|Rio de Janeiro, Brazil
|
|-
|Loss
|align=center|23–4
|Mario Sartori
|TKO (fighter quit after falling from ring)
|Capital Fight 3
|
|align=center|1
|align=center|N/A
|Brasília, Brazil
|
|-
|Win
|align=center|23–3
|Gilmar Silva Milhorance
|Submission (anaconda choke)
|Juiz de Fora Fight: Evolution
|
|align=center|2
|align=center|N/A
|Juiz de Fora, Minas Gerais, Brazil
|
|-
|Loss
|align=center|22–3
|Wendell de Oliveira Marques
|Decision (unanimous)
|Mega Kombat
|
|align=center|3
|align=center|5:00
|Governador Valadares, Minas Gerais, Brazil
|
|-
|Win
|align=center|22–2
|Luis Sérgio Melo Jr.
|Technical Submission (anaconda choke)
|Nitrix Champion Fight 5
|
|align=center|2
|align=center|2:09
|Balneário Camboriú, Santa Catarina, Brazil
|
|-
|Win
|align=center|21–2
|Rondinelli Rodrigues Gomes
|Decision (unanimous)
|Natal Fight Championship 2
|
|align=center|3
|align=center|5:00
|Natal, Rio Grande do Norte, Brazil
|
|-
|Win
|align=center|20–2
|Johnny Vigo
|Submission (arm-triangle choke)
|Face to Face 2
|
|align=center|2
|align=center|N/A
|Recreio dos Bandeirantes, Rio de Janeiro, Brazil
|
|-
|Win
|align=center|19–2
|Mario Sartori
|TKO (doctor stoppage)
|Real Fight 7
|
|align=center|1
|align=center|2:40
|São José dos Campos, São Paulo, Brazil
|
|-
|Loss
|align=center|18–2
|Carlos Alexandre Pereira
|TKO (head kick and punches)
|Shooto: Brazil 13
|
|align=center|2
|align=center|4:27
|Fortaleza, Ceará, Brazil
|
|-
|Win
|align=center|18–1
|Pedro Paulo dos Santos
|Submission (arm-triangle choke)
|Face to Face
|
|align=center|1
|align=center|N/A
|Recreio dos Bandeirantes, Rio de Janeiro, Brazil
|
|-
|Win
|align=center|17–1
|Felipe Arinelli
|Decision (split)
|World Fighting Combat
|
|align=center|3
|align=center|5:00
|Camboinhas, Niterói, Brazil
|
|-
|Win
|align=center|16–1
|Vitor Pimenta
|TKO (punches)
|The Warriors
|
|align=center|1
|align=center|N/A
|Barra da Tijuca, Rio de Janeiro, Brazil
|
|-
|Win
|align=center|15–1
|Antonio Silva
|Submission (anaconda choke)
|Chatuba Fight 2
|
|align=center|1
|align=center|2:30
|Rio de Janeiro, Brazil
|
|-
|Win
|align=center|14–1
|Gustavo Rosa
|Submission (rear-naked choke)
|Best Fighters
|
|align=center|2
|align=center|N/A
|Barra da Tijuca, Rio de Janeiro, Brazil
|
|-
|Win
|align=center|13–1
|Leonardo Jacare
|Decision (unanimous)
|Kawai Arena 1
|
|align=center|3
|align=center|5:00
|São José dos Campos, São Paulo, Brazil
|
|-
|Win
|align=center|12–1
|Dinarte Silva
|Submission (anaconda choke)
|Shooto: Brazil 9
|
|align=center|1
|align=center|1:57
|Fortaleza, Ceará, Brazil
|
|-
|Win
|align=center|11–1
|Eduardo Pereira
|Submission (anaconda choke)
|Juiz de Fora: Fight 6
|
|align=center|N/A
|align=center|N/A
|Brazil
|
|-
|Win
|align=center|10–1
|Julio Cabral
|Decision (unanimous)
|Win Fight and Entertainment 1
|
|align=center|3
|align=center|5:00
|Salvador, Bahia, Brazil
|
|-
|Win
|align=center|9–1
|Pedro Santos
|Submission (arm-triangle choke)
|Watch Out Combat Show 1
|
|align=center|3
|align=center|N/A
|Barra da Tijuca, Rio de Janeiro, Brazil
|
|-
|Win
|align=center|8–1
|Geno Vitale-Sansoti
|Submission (anaconda choke)
|Real Fight 5
|
|align=center|1
|align=center|N/A
|São José dos Campos, São Paulo, Brazil
|
|-
|Win
|align=center|7–1
|Vinicius Bohrer
|Submission (anaconda choke)
|Juiz de Fora: Fight 5
|
|align=center|3
|align=center|N/A
|Brazil
|
|-
|Win
|align=center|6–1
|Iberico El Toro
|Submission (arm-triangle choke)
|MMA Sports Combat 1
|
|align=center|1
|align=center|N/A
|Rio das Ostras, Rio de Janeiro, Brazil
|
|-
|Loss
|align=center|5–1
|Sérgio Moraes
|Submission (triangle choke)
|Mo Team League 2
|
|align=center|1
|align=center|2:07
|São Paulo, Brazil
|
|-
|Win
|align=center|5–0
|Rafael Freitas
|Submission (anaconda choke)
|Top Fighting Championships 3
|
|align=center|N/A
|align=center|N/A
|Rio de Janeiro, Brazil
|
|-
|Win
|align=center|4–0
|Ismael de Jesus
|Decision (unanimous)
|Top Fighting Championships 3
|
|align=center|3
|align=center|5:00
|Rio de Janeiro, Brazil
|
|-
|Win
|align=center|3–0
|Adriano Verdelli
|Submission (anaconda choke)
|Max Fight 3
|
|align=center|1
|align=center|0:28
|São Paulo, Brazil
|
|-
|Win
|align=center|2–0
|Diego Castro
|Decision (unanimous)
|Shooto: Brazil 2
|
|align=center|3
|align=center|5:00
|Flamengo, Rio de Janeiro, Brazil
|
|-
|Win
|align=center|1–0
|Emerson Ferreira
|Submission (anaconda choke)
|Shooto Brazil 1: The Return
|
|align=center|2
|align=center|4:20
|Flamengo, Rio de Janeiro, Brazil
|

References

Living people
1981 births
Brazilian male mixed martial artists
Welterweight mixed martial artists
Mixed martial artists utilizing Luta Livre